General Norman may refer to:

Charles Norman (British Army officer) (1891–1974), British Army major general
Francis Norman (1830–1901), Bengal Army lieutenant general
Henry Wylie Norman (1826–1904), British Indian Army general
Marciano Norman (born 1954), Indonesian Army lieutenant general